Spring Lake Park High School (SLPHS) is a public high school in Spring Lake Park, Minnesota, United States and is the only high school serving Spring Lake Park School District 16. In the 2020 - 2021 school year, The school enrolled about 1,850 students drawn primarily from the Minneapolis suburb of Spring Lake Park as well as parts of the suburbs of Blaine and Fridley. The Spring Lake Park Panthers are part of the North Suburban Conference.

History 
The first Spring Lake Park Junior/Senior High School opened for the 1955–56 school year.

"In 1976, Spring Lake Park became the first high school in the nation to provide Emergency Medical Services training.  As a result of a Title III grant, the Opportunities in Emergency Health Care Program started training high school students to become Emergency Medical Technicians (EMT’s)."

The campus was renovated throughout the 2008–09 school year. Kenneth Hall Elementary School, which was located on the high school campus, was torn down and the land converted into a parking lot.

Athletics 

The school sponsors the following varsity athletic teams and competes in the North Suburban Conference of the Minnesota State High School League:

Fall
 Soccer (boys)
 Football
 Cross country
 Soccer (girls)
 Swimming and diving (girls)
 Tennis (girls)
 Volleyball
 Dance Team (noncompetitive)
Winter
 Dance team
 Gymnastics
 Hockey (boys)
 Hockey (girls)
 Nordic skiing
 Swimming and diving (boys)
 Basketball (boys)
 Basketball (girls)
Spring
 Tennis (boys)
 Softball
 Golf (girls)
 Lacrosse (girls)
 Lacrosse (boys)
 Baseball
 Golf (boys)
 Track and field

Notable alumni 
 David Backes: professional National Hockey League player for the Anaheim Ducks, and previously the St. Louis Blues and Boston Bruins.
 Troy Merritt: professional golfer who has played on the PGA Tour and the Web.com Tour
 Brian Leonhardt: professional football player for Minnesota Vikings.

References 

Educational institutions established in 1955
Public high schools in Minnesota
Schools in Anoka County, Minnesota
1955 establishments in Minnesota